|}

The Goodwood Cup is a Group 1 flat horse race in Great Britain open to horses aged three years or older. It is run at Goodwood over a distance of 2 miles (3,219 metres), and it is scheduled to take place each year in late July or early August.

History
The first version of the Goodwood Cup was established in 1808, and it was won on three separate occasions by Bucephalus. Its trophy, a silver cup, was awarded permanently to the horse's owner after the third victory. The replacement trophy was a gold cup, and the inaugural running for this took place in 1812. The race was originally contested over 3 miles, but it was later cut to 2 miles and 5 furlongs. Since 1991 the race has been run over 2 miles.

A number of foreign-bred horses won the Goodwood Cup in the mid-19th century. Early winners for France included Jouvence, Monarque and Flageolet, and the United States was represented by Starke. A notable overseas victory came from Kincsem, a Hungarian filly undefeated in a career of fifty-four races.

The present system of race grading was introduced in 1971, and the Goodwood Cup was initially classed at Group 2 level. It was relegated to Group 3 status in 1985. It was shortened by a furlong in 1990, and reduced to its current length the following year. It regained Group 2 status in 1995. In 2017 the status was raised again to Group 1 and the purse was increased from £300,000 to £500,000.

The Goodwood Cup is one of Britain's leading events for stayers – horses that specialise in racing over long distances. It is the second leg of the Stayers' Triple Crown, preceded by the Gold Cup and followed by the Doncaster Cup.

The race is now held on the opening day of the five-day Glorious Goodwood meeting.

Records
Most successful horse (4 wins):
 Stradivarius – 2017, 2018, 2019, 2020

Leading jockey (5 wins):
 Jem Robinson – Fleur de Lis (1829), Glencoe (1834), Rockingham (1835), Beggarman (1840), Charles the Twelfth (1842)
 George Fordham – Baroncino (1855), Rogerthorpe (1856), Starke (1861), The Duke (1866), Border Minstrel (1883)
 Steve Donoghue – Queen's Square (1919), Mount Royal (1920), Bucks (1921), Cloudbank (1925), Brown Jack (1930)
 Lester Piggott – Gladness (1958), Exar (1960), Proverb (1974), Girandole (1975), Ardross (1981)
 Pat Eddery – Erimo Hawk (1972), Valuable Witness (1985), Mazzacano (1989), Sonus (1993), Grey Shot (1996)
 Frankie Dettori – Kayf Tara (1999), Schiaparelli (2009), Opinion Poll (2011), Stradivarius (2019, 2020)

Leading trainer (7 wins):
 John Scott – Hornsea (1836), Carew (1837), Charles the Twelfth (1841, 1842), Canezou (1849, 1850), Sweetsauce (1860)

Winners since 1849

The race was not run from 1915 to 1918 because of World War I and from 1940 to 1945 because of World War II
‡ denotes a winning filly or mare

Earlier winners

 1812: Shoestrings
 1813: Camerton
 1814: Banquo
 1815: no race
 1816: Scarecrow
 1817–24: no race
 1825: Cricketer
 1826: Stumps
 1827: Link Boy
 1828: Miss Craven
 1829: Fleur de Lis
 1830: Fleur de Lis
 1831: Priam
 1832: Priam
 1833: Rubini
 1834: Glencoe
 1835: Rockingham
 1836: Hornsea
 1837: Carew
 1838: Harkaway
 1839: Harkaway
 1840: Beggarman
 1841: Charles the Twelfth
 1842: Charles the Twelfth
 1843: Hyllus
 1844: Alice Hawthorn
 1845: Miss Elis
 1846: Grimston
 1847: The Hero
 1848: Van Tromp

See also
 Horse racing in Great Britain
 List of British flat horse races

References

 Paris-Turf: 
 Racing Post:
 galopp-sieger.de – Goodwood Cup.
 ifhaonline.org – International Federation of Horseracing Authorities – Goodwood Cup (2019).
 pedigreequery.com – Goodwood Cup – Goodwood.
 tbheritage.com – Goodwood Cup.
 

Flat races in Great Britain
Goodwood Racecourse
Open long distance horse races
Recurring sporting events established in 1812
British Champions Series
1812 establishments in England